Sir Ernest Whittome Shepperson, 1st Baronet (4 October 1874 – 22 August 1949) was a Conservative Party politician who was Member of Parliament (MP) for Leominster from 1922 to 1945.

Political career
Shepperson was elected Member of Parliament (MP) for Leominster in the 1922 general election as a member of the Conservative Party. As a farmer himself, he focused on agriculture and was a "champion" for the causes of other farmers. During discussions around the Import Duties Act 1932, he argued that imported meat should be taxed "in the interests of agriculture". He retired from parliament in 1945.

He also served as a magistrate.

Shepperson was knighted as part of the 1929 Dissolution Honours. He was made a baronet in the 1945 Dissolution Honours. The title became extinct on his death.

Personal life
He was born in the village of Benwick.

Shepperson died on 22 August 1949 at his home in Upwood, Huntingdonshire.

References

External links
 

1874 births
1949 deaths
Members of the Parliament of the United Kingdom for English constituencies
Baronets in the Baronetage of the United Kingdom
UK MPs 1922–1923
UK MPs 1923–1924
UK MPs 1924–1929
UK MPs 1929–1931
UK MPs 1931–1935
UK MPs 1935–1945